Zospeum is a genus of air-breathing land snails, terrestrial pulmonate gastropod mollusks in the family Ellobiidae, the salt marsh snails.

Species 
Species within the genus Zospeum include:
 Zospeum allegrettii Conci, 1956
 Zospeum alpestre (Freyer, 1855)
 Zospeum alpestre alpestre (Freyer, 1855)
 Zospeum alpestre kupitzense A. Stummer, 1984
 Zospeum alpestre bolei Slapnik, 1991
 Zospeum amoenum (Frauenfeld, 1856)
 Zospeum bellesi Gittenberger, 1973
 Zospeum biscaiense Gómez & Prieto, 1983
 Zospeum bucculentum Inäbnit, Jochum & Neubert 2019 
 Zospeum cariadeghense Allegretti, 1944
 Zospeum clathratum Inäbnit, Jochum & Neubert 2019 
 Zospeum costatum (Freyer, 1855)
 Zospeum exiguum Kuščer, 1932
 Zospeum frauenfeldii (Freyer, 1855)
 Zospeum frauenfeldii frauenfeldii (Freyer, 1855)
 Zospeum frauenfeldii osolei Slapnik, 1994
 Zospeum freyeri (F.J. Schmidt, 1849) 
 Zospeum galvagnii Conci, 1956
 Zospeum globosum Kušcer, 1928
 Zospeum gittenbergeri Jochum, Prieto & De Winter, 2019 
 Zospeum isselianum Pollonera, 1887 
 Zospeum kupitzense A. Stummer, 1984 
 Zospeum kusceri Wagner, 1912
 Zospeum lamellatum Bole, 1974
 Zospeum lautum (Frauenfeld, 1854)
 Zospeum likanum Bole, 1960
 Zospeum manitaense Inäbnit, Jochum & Neubert 2019  
 Zospeum obesum (Frauenfeld, 1854)
 Zospeum percostulatum Alonso, Prieto, Quiñonero-Salgado & Rolán, 2018 
 Zospeum pagodulum Inäbnit, Jochum & Neubert 2019 
 Zospeum praetermissum Jochum, Prieto & De Winter, 2019 
 Zospeum pretneri Bole, 1960
 Zospeum robustum  Inäbnit, Jochum & Neubert 2019 
 Zospeum schaufussi Frauenfeld, 1862 
 Zospeum spelaeum (Rossmässler, 1839))
 Zospeum spelaeum spelaeum (Rossmässler, 1839)
 Zospeum spelaeum schmidti (Frauenfeld, 1854)
 Zospeum subobesum Bole, 1974
 Zospeum tholussum Weigand, 2013 
 Zospeum trebicianum Stossich, 1899
 Zospeum turriculatum Allegretti, 1944
 Zospeum troglobalcanicum Absolon, 1916
 Zospeum vasconicum Prieto, De Winter, Weigand, Gómez & Jochum, 2015 
 Zospeum zaldivarae Prieto, De Winter, Weigand, Gómez & Jochum, 2015

Literature
Weigand, AM 2013: New Zospeum species (Gastropoda, Ellobioidea, Carychiidae) from 980 m depth in the Lukina Jama–Trojama cave system (Velebit Mts., Croatia). Subterranean Biology 11, 45-53. 
Weigand, AM, Jochum, A, Slapnik, R, Schnitzler, J, Zarza, E und Klussmann-Kolb, A 2013: Evolution of microgastropods (Ellobioidea, Carychiidae): integrating taxonomic, phylogenetic and evolutionary hypotheses. BMC Evolutionary Biology 2013, 13:18 (PDF; 2,7 MB)
Jochum, A., Weigand, A. M., Slapnik, R., Valentinčič, J., & Prieto, C. E. (2012). The microscopic ellobioid, Zospeum Bourguignat, 1856 (Pulmonata, Ellobioidea, Carychiidae) makes a big debut in Basque Country and the province of Burgos (Spain). MalaCo, 8, 400-403.(PDF)

References

External links 
 Animalbase - Zospeum
 Molluscs of central Europe

Ellobiidae
Taxonomy articles created by Polbot
Gastropod genera